Ricky Samuel Korboa (born 2 August 1996) is an English professional footballer who plays as a winger or striker for Woking.

Career

Carshalton Athletic
Korboa made his debut for Carshalton Athletic in March 2014, and played for the Robins across seven seasons, scoring 55 goals in 168 games. He was an original attendee at the V9 Academy in 2017. Korboa was named in the Isthmian League Team of the Season for 2018–19, and won five of the club's seven player of the year awards that season.

Northampton Town
Korboa signed for Northampton Town on 1 September 2020 for an undisclosed fee on a one-year contract, with an option for a second year. He made his debut on 5 September 2020 in a 3–0 win against Cardiff City in the EFL Cup, providing assists for the second and third goals. He made his debut in the league a week later on 12 September 2020, in a 2-2 draw with AFC Wimbledon where he scored at the end of the first half to equal the match for the second time.

On 11 May 2021 it was announced that he would leave Northampton when his contract expired at the end of the season.

Sutton United
He signed for Sutton United on 1 July 2021. He was released by Sutton at the end of the 2021–22 season.

Woking
On 28 May 2022, it was announced that Korboa was to join Woking, signing a two-year deal following the conclusion of his contract with Sutton in July.

Personal life
Born in England, Korboa is of Ghanaian descent.

Career statistics

References

1996 births
Living people
Footballers from Liverpool
English footballers
English sportspeople of Ghanaian descent
Association football wingers
Association football forwards
Carshalton Athletic F.C. players
Northampton Town F.C. players
Sutton United F.C. players
Woking F.C. players
Isthmian League players
English Football League players
V9 Academy players
Black British sportspeople